Nigel Sydney Augustine Harrison (29 November 1878 – 13 November 1947) was an English cricketer.  Harrison was a right-handed batsman who bowled right-arm fast-medium.  He was born at Maidstone, Kent, and was educated at Haileybury.

Harrison made his first-class debut for London County against Warwickshire in 1900.  He made three further first-class appearances for London County in that season, against Worcestershire, Warwickshire, and the Marylebone Cricket Club. In had little success in his four first-class appearances, scoring a total of 37 runs at an average of 6.16, with a high score of 18. He later moved to the north of England, playing for Durham in Minor Counties Championship against Northumberland in 1902 and the Yorkshire Second XI.

By 1901, he was a part of the 1st Volunteer Brigade, within the Durham Light Infantry.  In March 1901 he was granted the rank of 2nd Lieutenant, while in May 1902, he was promoted to Lieutenant. Harrison married Florence Kirk, the widower of Lord Charles Stewart Reginald Vane-Tempest-Stewart (son of Charles Vane-Tempest-Stewart, 6th Marquess of Londonderry), on 3 June 1903. In February 1904, he resigned his commission within the Durham Light Infantry. Harrison died at Norton, County Durham on 13 November 1947.

References

External links
Nigel Harrison at ESPNcricinfo
Nigel Harrison at CricketArchive

1878 births
1947 deaths
Sportspeople from Maidstone
People educated at Haileybury and Imperial Service College
English cricketers
London County cricketers
Durham cricketers
Durham Light Infantry officers
Military personnel from Kent